Ilythea spilota   is a species of 'shore flies' belonging to the family Ephydridae.

It is a Holarctic species with a limited distribution in Europe   They are found along shorelines of small streams. The larvae consume pinnate diatoms. Newly hatched larvae form a protective case by fastening a mix of sand grains and detritus to their dorsal surfaces.

Distribution
Canada, United States, Europe.

References

Ephydridae
Insects described in 1832
Taxa named by John Curtis
Diptera of Europe
Diptera of North America